Lady Nelson, was launched in Bermuda in 1801. Lady Nelson traded between London and Curacoa until 1803. She then became a whaler for J. Atkins and was valued at £6,500 in 1802. Under Captain James Lindsey (or Linsey) she sailed for the Galapagos. She was lost there on 15 November 1804. At the time of her loss she had 100 tons of oil. Her crew were saved.

Citations and references
Citations

Reverences
Clayton, Jane M. (2014) Ships employed in the South Sea Whale Fishery from Britain: 1775-1815: An alphabetical list of ships. (Berforts Group). 

1801 ships
Ships built in Bermuda
Whaling ships
Maritime incidents in 1804
Shipwrecks in the Pacific Ocean